Tommy-Jo "TJ" Nyman (born April 8, 2000) is an American pair skater. With his former skating partner, Sarah Feng, he is the 2018 JGP Czech Republic bronze medalist and the 2018 U.S. junior national silver medalist. The pair placed within the top five at the 2019 World Junior Championships.

Personal life 
Nyman was born on April 8, 2000 in London, England, United Kingdom. His mother, Katie, is a figure skating coach and his father, Peter, is a hockey coach. Nyman has an older sister named Mimmi.

Career

Early career 
As a singles skater, Nyman is the 2014 U.S. national juvenile and 2015 U.S. national intermediate champion. He concurrently competed pairs during his singles career, after pairing with Sarah Rose during the 2013–14 season. They are the 2014 U.S. national juvenile bronze medalists.

2016–2017 season 
Nyman teamed up with former ice dancer Sarah Feng in April 2017. The two were introduced by their coach, Dalilah Sappenfield.

2017–2018 season 
Feng/Nyman received their first Junior Grand Prix assignment in the 2017–18 season. They placed 8th at 2018 JGP Croatia.

Feng/Nyman won gold at 2017–18 Pacific Sectionals to qualify for Nationals in their first season together. They won silver at 2018 U.S. Nationals in junior pairs after skating together for less than a year. As a result, they were named to the U.S. team for the 2018 World Junior Figure Skating Championships in Sofia, Bulgaria, along with winners Audrey Lu / Misha Mitrofanov. Feng/Nyman finished eighth at the competition. Combined with Lu/Mitrofanov's fifth-place finish, they earned three spots for U.S. pairs at the 2019 World Junior Figure Skating Championships for the first time since 2016.

2018–2019 season 
Feng/Nyman opened their season at 2018 JGP Canada, where they finished sixth. They won their first international medal, a bronze, at 2018 JGP Czech Republic. Their results earned them a berth to the 2018–19 Junior Grand Prix Final in December in Vancouver, British Columbia, Canada. At the Junior Grand Prix Final, they withdrew after the short program due to Feng's injury. Despite withdrawing from 2019 U.S. Nationals, Feng/Nyman were named to the team for the 2019 World Junior Figure Skating Championships, where they placed fifth. Their placement, combined with teammates Laiken Lockley / Keenan Prochnow's sixth-place finish, retained three spots for U.S. pairs.

2019–2020 season 
Feng/Nyman began their season at Skate Detroit but on August 23, Nyman announced the end of their partnership.

On May 29, he announced that he had been paired with Nadezhda Labazina of Russia. The two never competed together after Labazina returned to Russia during the onset of the COVID-19 pandemic.

2020–2021 season 
On February 19, his coach, Dalilah Sappenfield, announced his new partnership with Brynne McIsaac.

On June 11, 2021, the German Ice Skating Union announced that they had released Aljona Savchenko, 37, to continue her competitive career in the United States. Nyman was named as Savchenko's partner and the two are training in Monument, Colorado. Less than two months later, though, Benoit Richaud said that Savchenko was looking for a new partner, indicating the two had split.

Programs

With Feng

Competitive highlights 
JGP: Junior Grand Prix

Pairs with Feng

Pairs with Rose

Men's singles

References

External links 
 

Living people
2000 births
English emigrants to the United States
Sportspeople from London
People from Melbourne, Florida
Viera High School alumni
American male pair skaters